The 14th TVyNovelas Awards is an Academy of special awards to the best soap operas and TV shows. The awards ceremony took place on May 7, 1996 in Mexico D.F. The ceremony was televised in Mexico by El canal de las estrellas.

Erika Buenfil and Eduardo Santamarina hosted the show. Lazos de Amor won 7 awards, including Best Telenovela, the most for the evening. Other winners La dueña and María la del barrio won 4 awards, Alondra and El premio mayor won 3 awards, Si Dios me quita la vida won 2 awards and Acapulco, cuerpo y alma and Bajo un mismo rostro won 1 each.

Summary of awards and nominations

Winners and nominees

Telenovelas

Others

Special Awards 
 Telenovela with the highest rating: María la del barrio
 10 years of permanence in the air: Mujer, casos de la vida real
 Best Scenography: José Luis Gómez Alegría for El premio mayor
 Best Costume Design: Silvia Terán and Lorena Pérez for Alondra
 Best Decor: Sandra Cortés for Si Dios me quita la vida
 Artistic Career: Javier López "Chabelo"
 The Most Sensual Lips: Marisol Santacruz

References 

TVyNovelas Awards
TVyNovelas Awards
TVyNovelas Awards
TVyNovelas Awards ceremonies